Steve Buxton (born December 23, 1961) is a former American football offensive tackle in the National Football League (NFL). He played college football at Indiana State University.

Buxton was also drafted in the 5th round with the 63rd overall pick in the 1985 USFL Draft by the Birmingham Stallions.

Buxton is the only player from Sullivan, Illinois to ever be drafted into the NFL. Buxton lettered all four years at Indiana State from 1981 to 1984. While at Indiana State Buxton was a part of the 1983 and 1984 Sycamore I-AA playoff teams. In 2002 the 1984 Indiana State Sycamores football team was inducted into the Indiana State University Athletics Hall of Fame.

References

1961 births
Living people
People from Sullivan, Illinois
Players of American football from Illinois
Indiana State Sycamores football players
American football offensive tackles